MiWay (pronounced "my way"; stylized miWAY), also known as Mississauga Transit and originally as Mississauga Transit Systems, is the municipal public transport agency serving Mississauga, Ontario, Canada, and is responsible to the city's Transportation and Works Department. MiWay services consist of two types of bus routes: MiLocal, local buses that make frequent stops, and MiExpress, express buses between major destinations. MiWay is the primary operator along the Mississauga Transitway, a dedicated east–west bus-only roadway.

MiWay's routes connect with GO Transit along with Brampton Transit to the north, Oakville Transit to the southwest, Milton Transit to the northwest and the Toronto Transit Commission (TTC) to the east.

MiWay is a member of the Canadian Urban Transit Association. In 2013, MiWay's annual ridership was 35.8million passengers, with more than 50.9million boardings.

History
Public transit in Mississauga was first operated by Charterways Limited as Mississauga Transit Systems with four buses in 1969. It was acquired by the city's newly formed Mississauga Transit in 1974, incorporating the former towns of Mississauga, Port Credit and Streetsville. Services began on November 1, 1973.

It later acquired routes formerly operated by others, such as;
 The Toronto Transit Commission's (TTC) 74 Port Credit bus, in February 1976, that had operated on Lakeshore Road from Long Branch since 1935. This succeeded a former interurban railway, dating back to 1892 as the Toronto and Mimico Electric Railway and Light Company.
 Gray Coach Lines, and later GO Transit, also served intercity routes on Dundas Street, and Hurontario Street, both being semi-rural provincial highways before the construction of present freeways such as Highways 401, 403, and 410.
Malton was served by the TTC's contracted 58 Malton bus until 2014, when the route was replaced by the TTC's 52 Lawrence West route. Local services in Malton were provided since 1969 and expanded after 1973.

In the late 1990s, due to a growing number of Mississauga Transit buses using Burnhamthorpe Road in Toronto to reach Islington subway station, which created congestion while not serving local Toronto residents along the route, this led to a resident blockade in an incident known as “the Battle of the Buses”. During the political dispute between Toronto and Mississauga city councils, the TTC commissioners responded by blocking Mississauga Transit buses from using Islington station’s transit terminal from 1998 to 2001 when a compromise was reached.

Mississauga Transit was rebranded MiWay on October 4, 2010. New MiWay-branded hybrid buses entered service, with orange MiLocal buses on local routes and blue MiExpress buses on express routes. Advertisements were placed on buses and shelters in September 2010 to introduce users to the new branding. Older buses using the old logo would continue to be used until they are decommissioned. Service levels did not change with the rebranding.

The reason for the company's new name is twofold: "Mi" could be interpreted as standing for Mississauga, and it is also a homophone for "My", suggesting possession.

As of December 1, 2011, MiWay's bus fleet is fully low-floor and accessible. As of October 22, 2012, bus stop pads have been put at all MiWay bus stops. This allowed the entire system to become fully accessible.

On April 29, 2019, 24-hour service was introduced on four bus routes.

Facilities

Major

Transitway stations
 
For more information on the transitway, see the Bus rapid transit section. All MiWay routes are wheelchair-accessible.

Terminals and junctions
All MiWay routes are wheelchair-accessible.

 †: September to April only

GO Transit stations
All MiWay routes are wheelchair-accessible.

Operations
Operations are funded by the city's municipal government, which allocates tax revenues to the transit operator. In 2022, the city allocated almost $90 million for Miway's budget.

Services

Routes
All routes are wheelchair-accessible. Routes 1 Dundas, 2 & 17 Hurontario, 3 Bloor, and 7 Airport operate 24 hours.

TTC-contracted route
Only one Toronto Transit Commission (TTC) route, 52B/52D Lawrence West, is operated by the TTC by contract on behalf of the City of Mississauga. The fare payment method is the same as for regular MiWay buses; via a Presto card, cash, or in some cases, a MiWay special purpose ticket, and transfers to connecting MiWay buses are included. A TTC youth, senior or student ticket or token, depending on the category that the passenger falls into, can also be used, but TTC-only Presto tickets cannot be used to pay the MiWay fare(s). A regular TTC fare is charged if continuing into, and the MiWay fare is charged for passengers riding from Toronto, with Toronto Pearson International Airport set as the boundary.  

From 2002 to 2010, another route 32B Eglinton West, operated to Explorer Drive in a similar arrangement.

Rapid transit

Bus rapid transit

The Mississauga Transitway is a mostly grade-separated twelve-stop bus rapid transit (BRT) line running alongside or on Highway 403 and Eglinton Avenue, and passes through the City Centre. The line also connects to buses to Pearson Airport at Renforth station.

Future routes

Light rail transit 
 

Mississauga will be served by a 19  km light rail transit (LRT) route on Hurontario Street, running north from Port Credit GO Station and extending beyond the city limits into Brampton to terminate at Steeles Avenue. The line will link Port Credit, the City Centre, and the south end of Brampton in response to increasing congestion and anticipated high growth in the corridor. Construction began in 2020, and the line is projected to enter service in the fourth quarter of 2024. It will replace MiExpress route 103 Hurontario Express.

The LRT will connect to two GO Transit rail lines (Milton line at Cooksville GO Station and Lakeshore West line at Port Credit GO Station), and other rapid transit lines including Züm Steeles, Züm Main, and the Mississauga Transitway).

Toronto Subway

In addition to the Hurontario LRT, Toronto's Line 5 Eglinton is being extended to meet the Mississauga Transitway's Renforth station, bringing the Toronto Subway into Mississauga. It is expected to be completed by 2030 or 2031. A later phase will extend the line further to Pearson Airport and a future Airport transit hub.

Dundas Street BRT

An additional BRT Line is proposed to be built along Dundas Street. The Dundas Street bus rapid transit line is an on-street route that is tentatively proposed to run along the Dundas Street corridor between Kipling Subway Station in Toronto and Ridgeway Drive in west Mississauga and continue west to Waterdown via Oakville and Burlington.

Accessibility
MiWay operates low-floor, wheelchair-accessible buses. The last high-floor bus was retired on December 1, 2011. A separate transit service for the disabled called Transhelp is operated by the Peel Regional Municipality.

Schedules
Mississauga Transit's paper "Ride Schedules" were discontinued in 2004. From 2005 onward, all timetables were only available from the system's website.

MiWay provides up-to-date bus schedules via their CityLink telephone service. In November 2005 MiWay inaugurated a schedule finder on their website, called Click 'n Ride, with information specific to each bus stop.

Fares
 MiWay's cash and credit card fare is $4.00 for all passengers. Presto cards have been accepted throughout the entire MiWay system since May 30, 2011. Since July 29, 2019, riders can also use their Presto cards to pay both their MiWay and Toronto Transit Commission fares on TTC-operated bus routes 52B and 52D Lawrence West operating between Mississauga (Westwood Mall or McNaughton) and Toronto (Lawrence Station). Credit cards and mobile wallets like Google Pay, Apple Pay, and Samsung Pay are accepted on Presto reader as of August 11, 2022. Cash fare is deducted. Customers aged 5 and under can ride all MiWay bus routes fare-free. Seniors aged 65 and older pay only $1.00 with valid senior photo identification.

Cash-paying customers can ask the bus driver for a paper transfer after depositing a cash fare into the fare box. In contrast, Presto-paying customers and those paying with a credit card or mobile wallet can tap their card on the Presto fare reader(s) when boarding and a transfer is automatically stored on their card.

Transfers are valid for two hours in any direction, including transfers to and from Brampton Transit and Oakville Transit, from the time of issue.

Presto card fares:

Other fares and fees:

Presto programs
In 2007, MiWay was the first test site for the new Presto card; Presto was adopted across the entire MiWay system in May 2011. Since launching the Presto card in Mississauga, MiWay has issued more than 9,000 cards; as of 2012, they were being used for more than 2.4million trips within the system. MiWay offers two programs exclusively for Presto cardholders:
 GO Transit co-fare: Since March 14, 2022, Presto cardholders who transfer from GO Transit onto connecting MiWay buses get free admission so long as the customer swipes a Presto card onto the connecting MiWay within the 3-hour transfer window.  Passengers transferring from MiWay to GO Transit services will also be reimbursed the difference between the MiWay fare and the co-fare upon disembarking from GO Transit. Customers without Presto cards have to pay the regular MiWay fare when connecting to or from GO trains and buses, as do children aged 6 to 12 regardless of whether they have a Presto card. Customers with a MiWay monthly bus pass stored on their Presto card also have to pay regular GO Transit fares when transferring between MiWay and GO Transit.
 Loyalty program: When Presto cardholders have paid for 12 regular MiWay fares in a calendar week, they are able to ride for free for the rest of the week. This program does not cover GO Transit co-fares and fares paid on other systems. The weekly ride count resets to zero on Mondays.

Smart Commute discount program
MiWay also offers discounted adult transit passes to employees of the members of Smart Commute Mississauga and Smart Commute Pearson Airport Area. Transit passes are automatically paid by payroll deduction.

Fleet/garages

Transit enforcement and staff
MiWay drivers are represented by Amalgamated Transit Union Local 1572.

Mississauga Transit enforcement officers patrol in white Dodge Chargers bearing a single black stripe and the wording "Transit Enforcement" in black. Mississauga Transit enforcement officers are part of the City of Mississauga Corporate Services team. Transit enforcement officers are designated as municipal law enforcement officers and enforce the Mississauga Transit Bylaw 425-03.

References

Works cited
 Mississauga – An Illustrated History, Roger E. Riendeau Windsor Publications Limited 1985.
 Mississauga Transit – 25 Years With You On Board 1974–1999, David Onodera, Canadian Transit Heritage Foundation 1999.
--contains a roster of buses used to 1999.
 Aging bus fleet to be replaced, GTA: Mississauga, Toronto Star, August 24, 2006, R5

External links

 
 Peter McLaughlin's Mississauga Bus Drawings
 Drawings and photos of Mississauga Transit buses
 Amalgamated Transit Union Local 1572

MiWay
Government agencies established in 1973